is a video game developed by Power Pros Production and published by Konami for the PlayStation. It is part of the Power Pros series. In 1995 an updated version titled  was released for the PlayStation and Sega Saturn.

Gameplay
Jikkyō Powerful Pro Yakyū '95 is a Japanese baseball game featuring players with oversized heads.

Reception
Japanese video game magazine Famitsu awarded all three version of the game a 31/40 score. Sega Saturn Magazine rated the Saturn version 21/30. Next Generation reviewed the PlayStation version of the game as "Power Baseball", rating it one star out of five, and stated that "This game could not only have been done on a 16-bit machine, but it could have been done better. [...] The gameplay is no better than average and somehow manages to match the graphics in nonrealism. Play ball, but play it with another game."

Notes

References

1994 video games
1995 video games
Baseball video games
Japan-exclusive video games
PlayStation (console) games
Sega Saturn games
Video games developed in Japan